L.A. Takedown, also called L.A. Crimewave and Made in L.A., is a 1989 crime thriller. Originally filmed as an unsuccessful pilot for an NBC television series, it was reworked and aired as a stand-alone TV film. The film was later released on VHS and, in Region 2, on DVD. L.A. Takedown was written and directed by Michael Mann and its ensemble cast includes Scott Plank, Alex McArthur, Michael Rooker, Daniel Baldwin, and Xander Berkeley. Scott Plank starred as Vincent Hanna, a detective on the hunt for professional criminal Patrick McLaren, played by McArthur; the story was based on the real-life investigation of Chicago criminal Neil McCauley. The film is best known as the basis for the 1995 film Heat. The film was moderately well received in retrospective reviews, but remains overshadowed by its remake.

Synopsis
Los Angeles robbery-homicide sergeant Vincent Hanna (Plank) is on the trail of a gang of ruthless professional criminals, led by the methodical Patrick McLaren (McArthur), whose only mistake in the last heist was the killing of armored car guards by the new recruit, Waingro (Berkeley), who is a loose cannon. But Hanna is soon surprised when he discovers that he and McLaren have quite a lot in common. While McLaren and his gang plan another heist, Hanna and his colleagues keep surveillance. Hanna is facing a personal problem, as the police work is straining his relationship with his wife, Lillian (Pouget). Moreover, McLaren is also facing a similar problem when he finds himself falling in love with Eady (Harrington), which he condemns due to the commitment required to his profession.

Things then take a turn for the worse, as McLaren unsuccessfully attempts to kill Waingro, who in turn betrays the team to the police. When Hanna arrives on the scene unexpectedly with the police, McLaren and his crew engage them in a mid-street shootout, in which most of McLaren's crew are killed. After making an unlikely escape, McLaren is presented with an opportunity to leave Los Angeles for a new life with Eady, but he decides to first take revenge for Waingro's betrayal. After McLaren tracks down Waingro to a hotel room, he is ambushed by Hanna and his team. Waingro takes advantage of the confusion to shoot McLaren through a closed door. While Hanna advises Waingro of his options in jail, for a string of previous murders, Waingro resists arrest and tries to pull a gun. In self-defence, Hanna forces Waingro through a hotel window, and Waingro falls fifteen floors to his death. In the final sequences, Hanna is reunited with his wife.

Cast
 Scott Plank as Vincent Hanna, sergeant of detectives working for the Los Angeles Police Department Robbery-Homicide division.
 Alex McArthur as Patrick McLaren, professional robber, head of his own gang of criminals.
 Michael Rooker as Detective Bosko, Hanna's second-in-command.
 Ely Pouget as Lillian Hanna, Vincent Hanna's estranged wife.
 Vincent Guastaferro as Michael Cerrito
 Victor Rivers as Detective Arriaga
 Richard Chaves as Detective Lou Casals
 Laura Harrington as Eady, McLaren's love interest.
 Peter Dobson as Chris Sheherlis
 Xander Berkeley as Waingro, a new recruit to McLaren's gang.
 Daniel Baldwin as Detective Bobby Schwartz
 R.D. Call as Harry Dieter
 Juan Fernández as Harvey Torena
 Clarence Gilyard, Jr. as Mustafa Jackson
 Cary-Hiroyuki Tagawa as Hugh Benny

The majority of the main cast appeared as guest stars in episodes of one or both of Michael Mann's two shows produced in the 1980s, Miami Vice and Crime Story.

Background and production
The origins of L.A. Takedown lay in real life. Michael Mann, the film's producer and screenwriter, cited producer, screenwriter and Chicago ex-police officer Chuck Adamson as an inspiration for the character of Vincent Hanna. Mann, who collaborated with Adamson on Miami Vice and Crime Story and several minor projects, was told of an investigation Adamson partook in. In 1963, he was investigating Neil McCauley, a professional robber. According to Mann, "one day they simply bumped into one another. [Adamson] didn't know what to do: arrest him, shoot him or have a cup of coffee." Adamson later killed McCauley in a stand-off after a failed robbery.

In 1979, Mann wrote an early 180-page draft for the screenplay. After making his first feature film, Thief, he re-wrote the draft. In a 1983 interview, he mentioned he was planning to make a film based on the draft, and was looking for someone to direct it. He later offered the director position to Walter Hill, but Hill refused. In the late 1980s, NBC  commissioned Mann to produce  a new television series. Mann felt the draft would make a good pilot episode, but decided to set the story in Los Angeles, deeming the L. A. Robbery–Homicide Division a better basis for a TV show. He took the 180-page screenplay and edited out roughly 110 pages to make room for a 90-minute pilot. However, the new series was not picked up by the network. Instead, it was released as a television film entitled L.A. Takedown.

The pilot was shot in nineteen days, with ten days of pre-production, which was noted atypically fast for Mann. The film score was written by Tim Truman, and cinematography done by Ron Garcia. The soundtrack also featured the song "L.A. Woman" performed by Billy Idol.

Release and reception
Mann had cast Scott Plank in the role of Hanna, which was not well received by NBC. They expressed interest in buying the series on the condition of finding a new lead actor, but Mann refused, leading to NBC's rejecting the show. The unsuccessful pilot was, however, aired as a television film on NBC on August 27, 1989 at 9:00 pm. In 1990, it was released on VHS in Finland, with several other European countries following in the early 1990s. On March 19, 2008, a DVD of the movie was released in Germany, featuring several scene selections as bonus content.

L.A. Takedown received mixed-to-positive reviews from film critics, with its acting being the most poorly received. On its first airing, The Globe and Mail gave the film a two star rating. Hal Erickson of AllRovi compared the film to Mann's cult TV series Miami Vice, but felt it emphasized style over substance. Dragan Antulov for Movie Reviews in Croatian, in comparing the film with its remake, Heat, praised Mann's choice to hire unknown actors for L.A. Takedown, which contrasted with big stars in Heat. Although he derided Berkeley's performance as Waingro, he concluded that it was "a fine companion piece to Heat." A reviewer from Lexikon des Internationalen Films of Germany was less enthusiastic, citing routine action sequences and a confusing plot due to the overly large cast. Lol Frost of Empire gave L.A. Takedown two out of five stars, acknowledging the worthiness of the plot, but citing lack of Mann's typical filming style. Frost concluded that the film was "a bit of a dud, but a noble effort."

Remake

After directing The Last of the Mohicans, Mann decided to remake L.A. Takedown into a wide release cinema feature. He viewed the film as a dry run for the original story, which was a complex, multi-layered crime drama edited out of the script for the television film. He consulted a longer 1986 draft to work on the remake. Having made L.A. Takedown, Mann felt he had a much better idea of how he wanted to structure the remake, saying: "I charted the film out like a 2 hr 45 min piece of music, so I'd know where to be smooth, where not to be smooth, where to be staccato, where to use a pulse like a heartbeat."

On April 5, 1994, Mann was reported to have abandoned an earlier plan to produce a James Dean biographical film in favor of the L.A. Takedown remake, entitled Heat. Heat was made on a  budget with a strong cast, and released in 1995. It featured Al Pacino as Vincent Hanna, Robert De Niro in the role of Patrick McLaren, now renamed Neil McCauley, Val Kilmer as Chris Shiherlis, Mykelti Williamson as Arriaga, now renamed Drucker, Diane Venora in the role of Lillian, now renamed Justine, and Ted Levine as Schwartz, now renamed Bosko. (Xander Berkeley, who played Waingro in L.A. Takedown, makes a brief appearance as a man who has a one-night stand with Justine.) The film was met with critical acclaim and grossed , becoming a financial success.

Not only featuring a bigger budget and well-known actors, Heat also had significant storyline differences when compared to L.A. Takedown. Among other things, the remake included Chris Shiherlis' gambling addiction, the subplot concerning Roger Van Zant and his attempt to double-cross the crew (in this film Waingro plots against the crew by himself), and Hanna's troubled stepdaughter—plot elements not present in the original film.  Because of this, Heat runs nearly twice the length of L.A. Takedown. Nowadays, L.A. Takedown is best known for being the basis of Heat, and is often compared to it in an unfavorable light.

References

External links

 
 

1989 films
1989 television films
1980s crime thriller films
1980s heist films
American crime thriller films
American heist films
American police detective films
Fictional portrayals of the Los Angeles Police Department
Films about bank robbery
Films directed by Michael Mann
Films set in Los Angeles
Films shot in Los Angeles
Films with screenplays by Michael Mann
NBC network original films
1980s English-language films
1980s American films